Donald Evans Dorrell (December 26, 1933 – May 3, 2003) was an American film and television actor. He was best known for playing the role of Donovan in the American western television series Pony Express.

Dorrell was born in Brownsville, Texas. In 1959, he joined the cast of the new syndicated western television series Pony Express playing the role of Brett Clark's troubleshooter Donovan. He then played Jud Donovan in the 1961 film The Gambler Wore a Gun and Roger in the film Tammy Tell Me True. Other film appearances included the roles of Stoney Jackson in When the Girls Take Over, Payne in the 1964 film Ensign Pulver, and Private Hoxie in the 1965 film None but the Brave. He also guest-starred in an episode of the sitcom television series Hazel. He retired from acting in 1965, last appearing in the film That Darn Cat!.

In 1962, Dorrell survived a plane crash in the sea off Avalon, California.
Dorrell died of cancer on May 3, 2003 in Port Ludlow, Washington, at the age of 69.

References

External links 

Rotten Tomatoes profile

1928 births
1978 deaths
People from Missouri
Male actors from Missouri
American male film actors
American male television actors
20th-century American male actors
Western (genre) television actors